Sir Robert Henry Davis (1870 – 1965) was an English inventor and director of the Siebe Gorman company. His main invention was the Davis Submerged Escape Apparatus, an oxygen rebreather that Davis patented for the first time in 1910, inspired by the rebreathers that Henry Fleuss patented as of 1876. Davis breathing set was destined to allow British submarine crews to escape when their ship started to sink.

While still directing Siebe Gorman Davis was the first British to buy a licence from the Cousteau-Gagnan Aqua-Lung (from the French company La Spirotechnique), starting commercialization of scuba sets in Britain as of 1948. Siebe Gorman aqualungs ended being known under the name of tadpole sets.

Davis Road in Chessington (where Siebe Gorman's factory was for a while) was named after him.

Publications 
He wrote the books: 
 Diving Scientifically and Practically Considered. Being a Diving Manual and Handbook of Submarine Appliances, first edition 1909, published by Siebe, Gorman & Co., Ltd. in London.
 A Diving Manual and Handbook of Submarine Appliances, second edition 1919, published by Siebe, Gorman & Co., Ltd. in London.
 Breathing in Irrespirable Atmospheres, and in some cases, also underwater, first published 1948 by St. Catherine Press, Ltd in London. It has 376 pages, c.250 photographs, and diagrams.
 4th edition, published 1935.

References

External links
 "Breathing in Irrespirable Atmospheres"
 "The Latest Means of Deep Sea Exploration", May 1932, Popular Mechanics Drawings of The Davis Deep-Sea Observation & Directional Chamber, a little-known Davis invention]
 "Historical Diver No.6 Winter 1995 - pages 16-22"

1870 births
1965 deaths
British inventors
Underwater diving in the United Kingdom